Malinovka is a rural locality (a settlement) in Spasskoye Rural Settlement, Verkhnekhavsky District, Voronezh Oblast, Russia. The population was 153 as of 2010. There are 2 streets.

Geography 
Malinovka is located 9 km northwest of Verkhnyaya Khava (the district's administrative centre) by road. Vishnyovka is the nearest rural locality.

References 

Rural localities in Verkhnekhavsky District